The  was held in 2010 in Yokohama, Kanagawa, Japan.

Awards
 Best Film:  - Dear Doctor
 Best Director: Akira Ogata - Nonchan Noriben
 Best New Director: 
Sumio Ōmori - Kaze ga Tsuyoku Fuiteiru
Takuji Suzuki - Watashi wa Neko Sutōkā
 Best Screenplay: Miwa Nishikawa - Dear Doctor
 Best Cinematographer: Katsumi Yanagijima - Dear Doctor
 Best Actor: Masato Sakai - Kuhio taisa and Nankyoku Ryōrinin
 Best Actress: Manami Konishi - Nonchan Noriben
 Best Supporting Actor:
Yoshinori Okada - Nonchan Noriben, Jūryoku Piero and Oto na ri
Yutaka Matsushige - Dear Doctor
 Best Supporting Actress: Sakura Ando - Love Exposure, Kuhio taisa and Tsumitoka batsutoka
 Best Newcomer:
Hikari Mitsushima - Love Exposure, Kuhio taisa and Pride
Machida Marie - Miyoko Asagaya Kibun
 Examiner Special Award: Kaze ga Tsuyoku Fuiteiru staff and casts
 Special Grand Prize: Kaoru Yachigusa

Best 10
 Dear Doctor
 Villon's Wife
 Love Exposure
 Nonchan Noriben
 Air Doll
 Kaze ga Tsuyoku Fuiteiru
 Shizumanu Taiyō
 Summer Wars
 Mt. Tsurugidake
 Ōsaka Hamlet
runner-up. Jūryoku Piero

References

Yokohama Film Festival
Y
Y
2010 in Japanese cinema